The Wolf River is a  river in the U.S. states of Tennessee and Kentucky that rises at the base of the Cumberland Plateau in Fentress County, Tennessee and flows westward for several miles before emptying into the Obey River at the Dale Hollow Reservoir.  The river is part of the Cumberland River drainage basin, and flows primarily in Middle Tennessee and southern Kentucky. Via the Cumberland and Ohio rivers, it is part of the Mississippi River watershed. It is not to be confused with the Wolf River of West Tennessee which flows into the Mississippi at Memphis.

Two miles below its source, the river absorbs Rotten Fork before entering the communities of Wolf River and Pall Mall, both of which are associated with World War I hero Alvin C. York. York's farm and gristmill were both located along the river at Pall Mall, and he and his family are buried in the large cemetery at Wolf River. York's farm is now part of a state historic park. Beyond Pall Mall, the river continues westward across the northeastern Highland Rim into Pickett County, passing just north of Byrdstown and flowing through a rolling area of forest and farmland. It crosses briefly into Clinton County, Kentucky, where its water becomes slack due to the impoundment of Dale Hollow Reservoir on the Obey River. The Wolf's confluence with the Obey is located just southeast of the point where Pickett County, Tennessee, Clay County, Tennessee, and Clinton County, Kentucky meet. Most of the lower half of the Wolf River comprises an embayment of Dale Hollow, which also extends into Cumberland County, Kentucky.

See also
List of rivers of Kentucky
List of rivers of Tennessee

References

Sgt. Alvin C. York State Historic Park 

Rivers of Kentucky
Rivers of Tennessee
Rivers of Fentress County, Tennessee
Rivers of Pickett County, Tennessee
Rivers of Clay County, Tennessee
Rivers of Clinton County, Kentucky